The Westmeath Topic is a weekly newspaper founded in Mullingar, Ireland on . What began as a small A4-size magazine under the name "TOPIC", the newspaper has gone from strength to strength, becoming one of the largest circulating newspapers in the Irish midlands. Along with less than a dozen newspapers on the island of Ireland, it is still printed, published and owned locally.

External links

topic.ie

Newspapers published in the Republic of Ireland
Mass media in County Westmeath
Mullingar